The paramedian arteries, or posteromedial central arteries, are pontine arteries – branches of the basilar artery that supply the pontine nuclei, corticobulbar tract, corticospinal tract, and corticopontine tract, with rami supplying some middle cerebellar peduncle fibres, parts of the pontine tegmentum, and occasionally the medial part of the medial lemniscus.

Uncal herniation can cause compression of the paramedian arteries and can result in Duret haemorrhages.

See also
 Weber's syndrome

References

Arteries of the head and neck